Gustaf Theodor Wallén (14 December 1860, Stockholm - 15 January 1948, Leksand), was a Swedish painter, graphic artist, and sculptor.

Biography
He was born to Fritz Leonard Wallén, a master carpenter, and his wife, Maria Gustava née Östergren. He began his studies in 1878, at a vocational school operated by the Royal Swedish Academy of Fine Arts, but applied for admission to the Academy itself the following year. He was accepted, and studied with Georg von Rosen. From 1885, he participated in the Academy's exhibitions and, in 1887, was presented with a Royal Medal for his painting "The Beach at Kivik". This enabled him to apply for several scholarships. 

After receiving a major stipend, he epent the years 1888-1892 on study trips throughout Europe and North Africa. In Paris, for a short time, he studied with William Bouguereau at the Académie Julian, then attended the Académie Colarossi. He also exhibited at the Salon. Several summers were spent at artists' colonies in Concarneau and Capri. 

When he returned to Sweden, he studied etching with Axel Tallberg. In addition to landscape and portrait paintings, in oils and watercolors, he created sculptures; notably the reliefs on the doors of the  Konstnärshuset at the Academy. He also had showings at numerous single events, but tended to be very withdrawn and reluctant to sell his works. His first solo exhibition was in 1947. 

Around 1900, he settled in Leksand, and joined a circle of artists led by Gustaf Ankarcrona.

His works may be seen at the Nationalmuseum, and the Leksand Museum. He was interred at the Norra Begravningsplatsen in Stockholm.

Selected works

References

Further reading
Urban Windahl: Gustaf Theodor Wallén – Skåne, Concarneau, Capri, Stockholm, Leksand, Stiftelsen Walléngården,  Leksand 1993,

External links

More works by Wallén @ ArtNet

1860 births
1948 deaths
Swedish painters
Swedish landscape painters
Swedish genre painters
Artists from Stockholm